Slavery in Somalia existed as a part of the East African slave trade. To meet the demand for menial labor, Bantus from southeastern Africa  slaves were exported from the Zanzibar and were sold in cumulatively large numbers over the centuries to customers in East Africa and other areas in Northeast Africa and Asia. People captured locally during wars and raids were also sometimes captured by Somalis and Ethiopians (mostly of Shanqella), Oromo, Amhara and Nilotic origin. However, the perception, capture, treatment and duties of both groups of slaves differed markedly, with Oromo favored because Oromo subjects were not viewed as linguistically and culturally different by their Somali owners.

History

Origin

Between 2500–3000 years ago, speakers of the original proto-Bantu language group began a millennia-long series of migrations eastward from their original homeland in the general Cameroon area of Central Africa. This Bantu expansion first introduced Bantu peoples to southern and southeastern Africa.

The Bantus inhabiting Somalia are descended from Bantu groups that had settled in Southeast Africa after the initial expansion from Cameroon, and whose members were later captured and sold into the East African slave trade.

Bantus are ethnically, physically, and culturally distinct from Somalis and Ethiopians they have remained marginalized ever since their arrival in the Horn of Africa.

All in all, the number of Bantu inhabitants in Somalia before the civil war is thought to have been about 80,000 (1970 estimate), with most concentrated between the Juba and Shabelle rivers in the south. Recent estimates, however, place the figure as high as 900,000 persons.

East African slave trade

The Indian Ocean slave trade was multi-directional and changed over time. To meet the demand for menial labor, Bantu slaves were captured by Tanzania slave traders from southeastern Africa were sold in cumulatively large numbers over the centuries to customers in Egypt, Arabia, the Persian Gulf, India, the Far East, the Indian Ocean islands, Ethiopia and Somalia.

From 1800 to 1890, between 25,000 and 50,000 Bantu slaves are thought to have been sold from the slave market of Zanzibar alone to the Somali coast by Tanzanian slave traders. Most of the slaves were from the Majindo, Makua, Nyasa, Yao, Zalama, Zaramo and Zigua ethnic groups of Tanzania, Mozambique and Malawi. Collectively, these Bantu groups are known as Mushunguli, which is a term taken from Mzigula, the Zigua tribe's word for "people" (the word holds multiple implied meanings including "worker", "foreigner", and "servant").

16th to 20th centuries
Bantu and Oromo adult and children slaves (referred to collectively as jareer by their Somali and Ethiopian handlers.) were purchased in the slave market exclusively to do undesirable work on plantation with oversight from the Arabian peninsula. They were made to work in plantation exclusively owned by Italian government (Eno & Leahman, 2003) along the southern Shebelle and Jubba rivers, harvesting lucrative cash crops such as grain and cotton. Bantu slaves toiled under the control of the Italian government.

The Bantus were conscripted to forced labor on Italian-owned plantations since the Somalis themselves were averse to what they deemed menial labor, and because the Italians viewed the Somalis as racially superior to the Bantu.

The Italian colonial administration abolished slavery in Somalia at the turn of the 20th century. However, some Somali clans notably the Biimal clan opposed this idea. The Bimaals fought Italians to keep their slaves. Although the Italians freed some Bantus, some Bantu groups, remained enslaved well until the 1930s, and continued to be despised and discriminated against by large parts of Somali society.

Nilotic slaves
In the late 19th century,  Tanzanians also captured other jareer peoples from the coastal regions of Kenya to work for them as slaves and clients. Referred to as the Kore, these Nilo-Saharan Maa-speaking Nilotes were later emancipated by British colonial troops. They subsequently resettled on the Lamu seaboard as fishermen and cultivators. Like many Bantus, the Kore reportedly now speak the Afro-Asiatic Somali language on account of their time in servitude.

Other slaves
In addition to Bantu plantation slaves, Somalis sometimes enslaved peoples of Oromo pastoral background that were captured during wars and raids on Oromo settlements. However, there were marked differences in terms of the perception, capture, treatment and duties of the Oromo pastoral slaves versus the Bantu plantation slaves.

On an individual basis, Oromo subjects were not viewed as racially jareer by their Somali captors. The Oromo captives also mostly consisted of young children and women, both of whom were taken into the families of their abductors; men were usually killed during the raids. Oromo boys and girls were adopted by their Somali patrons as their own children. Prized for their beauty and viewed as legitimate sexual partners, many Oromo women became either wives or concubines of their Somali captors, while others became domestic servants. In some cases, entire Oromo clans were assimilated on a client basis into the Somali clan system.

Neither captured Oromo children nor women were ever required to do plantation work, and they typically worked side-by-side with the Somali pastoralists. After an Oromo concubine gave birth to her Somali patron's child, she and the child were emancipated and the Oromo concubine acquired equal status to her abductor's other Somali wives. According to the Somali Studies pioneer Enrico Cerulli, in terms of diya (blood money) payments in the Somali customary law (Xeer), the life of an Oromo slave was also equal in value to that of an ordinary ethnic Somali.

Freedom for Oromo slaves was obtained through manumission and was typically accompanied by presents such as a spouse and livestock. During abolition, former Oromo slaves, who generally maintained intimate relations with the Somali pastoralists, were also spared the harsh treatment reserved for the Bantu and Nilotic plantation slaves.

References

Slavery by country
Society of Somalia
History of Somalia by topic
History of slavery
Slavery in Africa
Human rights abuses in Somalia
Islam and slavery